Erythroneura is a leafhopper genus in the family Cicadellidae.

Species (79) 
Erythroneura aclys – Erythroneura acuticephala – Erythroneura amanda – Erythroneura ancora – Erythroneura anfracta – Erythroneura ariadne – Erythroneura atropictila – Erythroneura aza – Erythroneura bakeri – Erythroneura beameri – Erythroneura bidens – Erythroneura bistrata – Erythroneura bistrig – Erythroneura browni – Erythroneura caetra – Erythroneura calycula – Erythroneura cancellata – Erythroneura carinata – Erythroneura cassavae – Erythroneura chaudhrii – Erythroneura claripennis – Erythroneura coloradensis – Erythroneura comes – Erythroneura corni – Erythroneura cymbium – Erythroneura delicata – Erythroneura diva – Erythroneura doris – Erythroneura elegans – Erythroneura elegantula – Erythroneura evansi – Erythroneura festiva – Erythroneura fiduciaria – Erythroneura flavogutta – Erythroneura fraxa – Erythroneura fulvidorsum – Erythroneura gilensis – Erythroneura glabra – Erythroneura glavogutta – Erythroneura harmsi – Erythroneura infuscata – Erythroneura integra – Erythroneura ipoloa – Erythroneura kanwakae – Erythroneura kashmirensis – Erythroneura kennedyi – Erythroneura kerzhneri – Erythroneura lalage – Erythroneura leveri – Erythroneura macarangae – Erythroneura modesta – Erythroneura nayavua – Erythroneura nudata – Erythroneura octonotata – Erythroneura omaska – Erythroneura ontari – Erythroneura ortha – Erythroneura palimpsesta – Erythroneura plagiata – Erythroneura pontifex – Erythroneura postica – Erythroneura prima – Erythroneura prosata – Erythroneura reflecta – Erythroneura rewana – Erythroneura rosa – Erythroneura rubra – Erythroneura rubrella – Erythroneura shirozui – Erythroneura subfumata – Erythroneura tacita – Erythroneura triapitsyni – Erythroneura tricincta – Erythroneura urakensis – Erythroneura vaga – Erythroneura vagabunda – Erythroneura vitifex – Erythroneura vitis – Erythroneura ziczac

References

External links 

Cicadellidae genera
Erythroneurini
Taxa named by Asa Fitch